Artaxias II or Arsuk (არსუკ) (died in 1 AD), was a member of the Nimrodid Dynasty and was a king of Iberia (Kartli, eastern Georgia) from c. 20 BC to 1 AD.

According to a legendary account from the medieval Georgian annals, he was a descendant of Nimrod and Parnavaz through his father, Mirian II, and was a member of the Arshakuniani dynasty through his mother.  Arsuk has to deal with the return of the exiled Pharnabazid prince Aderki (son of Kartam, adopted son of Bratman).  In an ensuing battle between the two, Aderki emerged victorious and became king.

References

AD 1 deaths
Pharnavazid kings of Iberia
1st-century BC rulers in Asia
1st-century monarchs in Asia
Year of birth unknown